Mohamed Guessous (1938 – 7 February 2014) was a Moroccan sociologist. He was also an active politician in the Socialist Union of Popular Forces.

References

People from Fez, Morocco
1938 births
2014 deaths
Socialist Union of Popular Forces politicians
Moroccan sociologists
Moroccan academics
Princeton University alumni